Mary Wells Morris (September 4, 1764 – November 6, 1819) is the person that Wellsboro, Pennsylvania is named after. She was born in Burlington County, New Jersey. She moved to Tioga County with her husband Benjamin, her son Samuel, and her daughter Rebecca. They were Philadelphia Quakers. They became the first residents of the Wellsboro. She remained in Wellsboro until she died on November 6, 1819; she is buried with her husband in the Wellsboro Cemetery.

Recently a life-size bronze statue was erected in her honor. Despite not finding any remaining images of Mary Wells, the designers of the statue crafted a likeness based on surviving images of her mother.

References 

1764 births
1819 deaths
18th-century American people
American Quakers
People from Burlington County, New Jersey
People from Tioga County, Pennsylvania